Song Islands is a collection of singles and rare songs by the Microphones, recorded between 1998 and 2002.

Track listing

References

The Microphones albums
2002 compilation albums